NASA Astronaut Group 19 was a NASA spaceflight team that saw the training of two pilots, six mission specialists, three educator mission specialists to become NASA astronauts. These 11 astronauts began training in 2004.
This was the last group to fly the Space Shuttle.

Pilots
Randolph Bresnik (2 flights) 
STS-129 (Atlantis)
Soyuz MS-05
Flight engineer/Commander, ISS Expedition 52/53
James Dutton (1 flight)
Pilot, STS-131 (Discovery)

Mission specialists
Christopher Cassidy - Chief of the Astronaut Office 2015-2017 (3 flights)
STS-127 (Endeavour)
Soyuz TMA-08M
Flight engineer, ISS Expedition 35/36
Soyuz MS-16
Flight engineer/Commander, ISS Expedition 62/63
José M. Hernández (1 flight)
STS-128 (Discovery) 
Robert S. Kimbrough (3 flights)
STS-126 (Endeavour)
 Soyuz MS-02
Flight engineer/Commander, ISS Expedition 49/50
 Commander, SpaceX Crew-2 
Flight engineer, Expedition 65
Thomas Marshburn (2 flights)
STS-127 (Endeavour)
Soyuz TMA-07M
Flight engineer, ISS Expedition 34/35
 Pilot (SpaceX Crew-3), Current flight
Expedition 66/67
Robert Satcher (1 flight)
STS-129 (Atlantis)
Shannon Walker
Soyuz TMA-19
Flight engineer, ISS Expedition 24/25
SpaceX Crew 1
Flight engineer/commander, ISS Expedition 64/65

Educator mission specialists
Joseph M. Acaba - Chief of the Astronaut Office 2023-Present (3 flights)
Mission specialist, STS-119 (Discovery)
Soyuz TMA-04M
Flight engineer, ISS Expedition 31/32
Soyuz MS-06
Flight engineer, ISS Expedition 53/54Richard R. Arnold (2 flights)
Mission specialist, STS-119 (Discovery)
Soyuz MS-08
Flight engineer, ISS Expedition 55/56Dorothy Metcalf-Lindenburger' (1 flight)
STS-131 (Discovery'')

NASA biographies

See also
List of astronauts by selection

External links
Current astronauts page
Retired astronauts page
Foreign astronauts page
Payload specialist astronauts page

NASA Astronaut Corps
Lists of astronauts